Robert Phillip Marcucci (February 28, 1930 – March 9, 2011) was an American lyricist, talent manager, film producer, and the owner of Chancellor Records and Robert P. Marcucci Productions. He discovered and managed the careers of Fabian and Frankie Avalon, among others. The 1980 movie, The Idolmaker, is loosely based on his life in the record industry.

Early life and career
Born and raised in Philadelphia, Bob Marcucci started in the music industry at age 25, as a songwriter, and subsequently borrowed $10,000 from his father to launch Chancellor Records.

He signed Frankie Avalon as one of his first acts, but by the time Frankie had reached the age of 19, his appeal as a recording artist had begun to wane and Marcucci was in need of a new star.

His next act was his neighbor's 14-year-old son. Marcucci's neighbor had suffered a heart attack, after which Marcucci went to help the family. He spotted the neighbor's young son and after the father had recovered, inquired as to whether the youngster would be interested in a career in music. Fabian initially declined but, because his family needed the money, eventually signed on as Marcucci's next act. After two years Fabian bought out his contract.

Marcucci was the long-time manager of Hollywood gossip columnist Rona Barrett. He was co-producer of the 1984 version of The Razor's Edge, starring Bill Murray in a rare dramatic role. The following year, he produced A Letter to Three Wives for television.

Later years
In his later years, Marcucci continued to manage artists such as Danielle Brisebois, Ami Dolenz, Michael T. Weiss, Ron Moss and Cheryl Powers through his production companies.

Marcucci died on March 9, 2011, at a hospital in Ontario, California, of respiratory complications and severe infections.

References

External links

Interview at LukeFord.Net

1930 births
2011 deaths
American talent agents
American people of Italian descent
Film producers from Pennsylvania
Songwriters from Pennsylvania
Musicians from Philadelphia
Deaths from respiratory failure